A company's earnings before interest, taxes, depreciation, and amortization (commonly abbreviated EBITDA, pronounced , , or ) is a measure of a company's profitability of the operating business only, thus before any effects of indebtedness, state-mandated payments, and costs required to maintain its asset base. It is derived by subtracting from revenues all costs of the operating business (e.g. wages, costs of raw materials, services ...) but not decline in asset value, cost of borrowing, lease expenses, and obligations to governments. 

Though often shown on an income statement, it is not considered part of the Generally Accepted Accounting Principles (GAAP) by the SEC and the SEC hence requires that companies registering securities with it (and when filing its periodic reports) reconcile EBITDA to net income.

Usage and criticism
EBITDA is widely used when assessing the performance of a company. EBITDA is useful to assess the underlying profitability of the operating businesses alone, i.e. how much profit the business generates by providing the services, selling the goods etc. in the given time period. This type of analysis is useful to get a view of the profitability of the operating business alone, as the cost items ignored in the EBITDA computation are largely independent from the operating business: The interest payments depend on the financing structure of the company, the tax payments on the relevant jurisdictions as well as the interest payments, the depreciation on the asset base and depreciation policy chosen and the amortisation on takeover history with its effect on goodwill among others. EBITDA is widely used to measure the valuation of private and public companies (e.g. saying that a certain company trades at x times EBITDA, meaning that the company value as expressed through its stock price equates to x times its EBITDA). In its attempt to display EBITDA as a measure of the underlying profitability of the operating business, EBITDA is often adjusted for extraordinary expenses, i.e. expenses that the company believes do not occur on a regular basis. These adjustments can include bad debt expenses, any legal settlements paid, costs for acquisitions, charitable contributions and salaries of the owner or family members. The resulting metric is called adjusted EBITDA or EBITDA before exceptionals. 

A negative EBITDA indicates that a business has fundamental problems with profitability. A positive EBITDA, on the other hand, does not necessarily mean that the business generates cash. This is because the cash generation of a business depends on EBITDA as well as on capital expenditures (needed to replace assets that have broken down), taxes, interest and movements in Working Capital.  

While being a useful metric, one should not rely on EBITDA alone when assessing the performance of a company. The biggest criticism of using EBITDA as a measure to assess company performance is that it ignores the need for capital expenditures in its assessment. However, capital expenditures are needed to maintain the asset base which in turn allows for generating EBITDA. Warren Buffett famously asked, "Does management think the tooth fairy pays for capital expenditures?". A fix often employed is to assess a business on the metric EBITDA - Capital Expenditures.

Margin 
EBITDA margin refers to EBITDA divided by total revenue (or "total output", "output" differing from "revenue" according to changes in inventory).

Variations

EBITA 
Earnings before interest, taxes, and amortization (EBITA) is derived from EBITDA by subtracting Depreciation. 

EBITA is used to include effects of the asset base in the assessment of the profitability of a business. In that, it is a better metric than EBITDA, but has not found widespread adoption.

EBITDAR

EBIDAX 
Earnings Before Interest, Depreciation, Amortization and Exploration (EBIDAX) is a non-GAAP metric that can be used to evaluate the financial strength or performance of oil, gas or mineral company.

Costs for exploration are varied by methods and costs. Removal of the exploration portion of the balance sheet allows for a better comparison between the energy companies.

OIBDA 
Operating income before depreciation and amortization (OIBDA) refers to an income calculation made by adding depreciation and amortization to operating income.

OIBDA differs from EBITDA because its starting point is operating income, not earnings. It does not, therefore, include non-operating income, which tends not to recur year after year. It includes only income gained from regular operations, ignoring items like FX changes or tax treatments.

Historically, OIBDA  was created to exclude the impact of write-downs resulting from one-time charges, and to improve the optics for analysts comparing to previous period EBITDA. An example is the case of Time Warner, who shifted to divisional OIBDA reporting subsequent to write downs and charges resulting from the company's merger into AOL.

EBITDAC 
Earnings before interest, taxes, depreciation, amortization, and coronavirus (EBITDAC) is a non-GAAP metric that has been introduced following the global COVID-19 pandemic. 

EBITDAC is a special case of adjusted EBITDA. 

On 13 May 2020, the Financial Times mentioned that German manufacturing group Schenck Process was the first European company to use the term in their quarterly reporting. The company had added back €5.4m of first-quarter 2020 profits that it said it would have made were it not for the hit caused by 'missing
contribution margin and cost absorption reduced by direct financial state support received majorly in China so far'.

Other companies picked up this EBITDAC measure as well, claiming the state-mandated lockdowns and disruptions to the supply chains distort their true profitability, and EBITDAC would show how much these companies believe they would have earned in the absence of the coronavirus.

Like other forms of adjusted EBITDA, this can be a useful tool to analyse companies but should not be used as the only tool.

See also
 Earnings before interest and taxes (EBIT)
 EV/EBITDA
 Gross profit
 Net income
 Net profit
 Operating margin
 Owner earnings
 P/E ratio
 Revenue

References

Further reading

External links
 Investopedia definition of EBITDA

Fundamental analysis
Profit
Private equity